7th & Capitol (southbound) and 8th & Capitol (northbound) is a split Sacramento Regional Transit District light rail station, served by all three RT light rail lines:  Blue, Gold and Green.  It is located in Downtown Sacramento at the intersection of Capitol Mall and 7th Street (south platform) and 8th Street (north platform) and within walking distance of the California State Capitol, Tower Bridge, Golden 1 Center, and Raley Field.  Also, it is the westernmost station served by all three lines where transfers can be made between the Blue Line and the Gold and Green Lines.

This is a primary light rail station for the Golden 1 Center, home of the NBA's Sacramento Kings and other events. The previous station, the 7th & K platform of St. Rose of Lima Park, was closed permanently in 2016 to improve traffic and pedestrian flow for 7th Street.  The station recently underwent upgrades in 2016 to accommodate for the increased ridership from the arena, and has improved safety, security, sign, communication, and lighting fixtures.

Platforms and tracks

References

See also
Sacramento Regional Transit District

Sacramento Regional Transit light rail stations
Railway stations in the United States opened in 1987